Røssøyvågen is a village in Aukra Municipality in Møre og Romsdal county, Norway. It is located on the west side of the island of Gossa.

References

Aukra
Villages in Møre og Romsdal